VINITI Database RAS is a database provided by the All-Russian Institute for Scientific and Technical Information (VINITI). The database is devoted to scientific publications. It is described as a large abstracting database. In general,  it is indexed for the natural sciences, exact sciences, and technical sciences. Included in this database is AJ (Abstract Journal), indexed from 1981 to the present day.

The database is made up of published materials encompassing, conference proceedings, trade publications, thesis, periodicals, books, patents, regulatory documents, and collected scientific literature. Russian sources make up 30% of the deposited scientific works. The database produces documents that have a bibliographal description, keywords, a heading and an abstract.  Primary source abstracts are mostly in Russian.

Another organizational structure of the VINITI database is its divisions into 29 thematic fragments. Also, there are over 230 editions of this database. A single Polythematic database was added in 2001, which is able to combine all the thematic fragments, except for "Mathematics". In addition, the thematic fragment, "Chemistry", is updated two times per month.

Scientific literature deposited at VINITI
The following is a sample of the scientific literature that is deposited at the All-Union Institute of Scientific and Technical Information (VINITI).

Peer reviewed journals
Materials Science, Springer New York. Materials Science is a translation of the peer reviewed Ukrainian journal Fizyko-Khimichna Mekhanika Materialiv.
Russian Journal of Physical Chemistry A ( (Zhurnal fizicheskoi khimii). MAIK Nauka/Interperiodica (publisher). 2010.  It was established in 1930.

Separate editions of VINITI
The separate editions of this database are respectively entitled: "Scientific and scientific-technical journals and collections", 
"Overview",  
"Express Info", 
"Abstract collections", 
"Information Collections", 
"Newsletters".

Scientific and scientific-technical journals and collections
The following issues are published in Scientific and scientific-technical journals and collections: 
Problems safety
Integrated Logistics
Chemical and Biological Safety
Membranes. A series of "Critical Technology"
International Forum on Information
Scientific and technical information. Series 1. "Organization and methods of work"
Scientific and technical information. Series 2. "Information Processes and Systems"

Overview
Overview is a periodical published 12 times per annum. It is a depository for one or several survey papers in a particular field of science and technology. Analytical content and synthesis of data is included in this collection. Survey information produced by VINITI RAS is in the following publications:

Scientific and technical aspects of environmental protection
Problems of the Environment and Natural Resources
Environmental Assessment
Environmental Economics
Contemporary Mathematics and Its Applications
Thematic reviews

Express Info
Express information is  a periodical publication which is made up of detailed abstracts of what is considered to be significant scientific and technical documents. This published in Russia and abroad. Express information publishes the following issues:
Testing and measuring technology
Saving technologies
Legal issues of environmental protection
Packaging. Containers
Management, Logistics and Informatics in Transport

Abstract collections
Abstract collections is a periodic, abstracting service for domestic and foreign,  scientific and technical, literature. This includes abstracts for  books, dissertations, patent documents, analysis, overview, and deposited scientific works published in the Abstract Journal of  VINITI RAS, . Abstract collections publishes the following issues:
Energy Savings
Clinical Endocrinology
Radiodiagnosis
Medical work
Psychiatry

Information Collections
Information Collections is also a periodical which publishes detailed abstracts, and analysis on foreign documents. The foreign works are characterized as  scientific, technical, legal and economics literature, focused and related to a defined area of  science and technology. Information Collections publishes the following issues:
The safety and emergencies
Transportation: science, technology, management
Federal and regional programs Russia
Economics of Contemporary Russia
Cardiovascular Surgery
News of Anesthesiology and Intensive Care
Emergency Medicine. Office of Disaster Medicine

Newsletters
Newsletters publishes the following issues:
Bulletin of the international scientific congresses, conferences, congresses, exhibitions
The foreign press about the economic, scientific-technical and military potential of the CIS member states and the technical means to detect. Series: 1, 2, 3.
Economics and Management in Foreign Countries
Crime abroad

Deposited scientific works
This separate edition contains the "Bibliographic Index".  The bibliographic index contains bibliographic descriptions of scientific papers, deposited at VINITI RAS and industry centers.

Thematic fragments
The 29 thematic fragments, mentioned above,  are broad subject fields (categories) such as the following:
Automation and electronics AB 1981
Astronomy AU 1989
Biology BI  1981
Computational Science
Engineering MN 1981
Medicine MD 1998
Metallurgy MT 1981
Physics FI 1983

Subcategories
These broad subject fields are each further divided into subfields. For example, Astronomy (Au) encompasses:

AS01 Astronomy (51)
Retrospective from 1989
This subfield includes ordinary inquiries involving  astronomy. Moreover, this subfield includes theoretical aspects of astronomy and celestial mechanics. Methods of astronomical observations, along with observatories, instruments, and devices are categorized here.  This subfield also indexes documents related to the following: Sun, Solar System, Star, Nebulae, Interstellar medium, and Cosmology. Also: Astrometry and Astron.

AS03 Study of Earth from space (73)
Retrospective from 1989
This subfield includes general issues in Earth observation such as the physical, geometric, geodynamic framework of Earth from space, along with methods and tools for studies of Earth from space. Documents from research programs and papers concerning their objectives are indexed in this subfield. Papers pertaining to the space systems of earth, and documents which place space information  under the purview of the Earth Sciences and economic sectors are available in this subfield. Economics and cost-effectiveness studies of the Earth from space are part of this subfield.

AS02 Surveying and aerial photography (52)
Retrospective from 1989
This subfield includes ordinary inquiries involving Geodesy and Cartography. Moreover, this subfield includes theoretical studies of Geodesy. The subfield also indexes the following: Geodetic Astronomy, Space geodesy, Gravimetry, and geodetic methods for solving geodynamic problems.  The results of geodetic measurements are given mathematical interpretations. Surveying Instruments, and their study are also included.

This subfield also includes documents about studying and mapping the Moon's size, shape, surface topography, and its gravitational and magnetic fields.  In other words, determining by observation and measurement, the exact positions of points and the figures and areas of large portions of the Moon's surface, or the shape and size of the Moon, i.e., "Selenodesy". These methods are applied to other planets as well.

AS04 Space exploration (62)
Retrospective from 1989
This subfield includes ordinary inquiries involving space exploration.

See also
Universal Decimal Classification (UDC)

References

External links
 Theme of the database VINITI RAS Google translation required for English.
Largest chemical reaction database available for in-house use. Information Today. Vol 9.No.7 (July–August 1992): page 12(1).

Databases in Russia
Bibliographic databases and indexes
Online databases
Publications established in 1953
Science and technology in Russia
Science and technology in the Soviet Union
Russian Academy of Sciences